Arthur William Tempest Wright (23 September 1919 – 27 May 1985) was an English footballer who played as a left half. A former England schoolboy international, Wright spent his entire club career with Sunderland. After retiring, he joined the club's coaching staff.

References

1919 births
English footballers
Sunderland A.F.C. players
1985 deaths
Association football wing halves
English Football League players
English Football League representative players
Sunderland A.F.C. non-playing staff